Abrahão De Moraes (1916–1970) was a Brazilian astronomer and mathematician.

He taught at the Escola Politécnica and also served as director of the Instituto Astronômico e Geofísico.

The Observatório Abrahão de Moraes (OAM) is named after him.  Founded in 1972, it is situated in the municipality of Valinhos, 90 km from São Paulo.

The crater De Moraes on the Moon is named after him.

Sources 
Observatório Abrahão de Moraes

1916 births
1970 deaths
Brazilian astronomers
20th-century astronomers